Rolf Streuli (born 13 July 1931) is a Swiss rower. He competed at the 1960 Summer Olympics in Rome with the men's coxless four where they came sixth.

References

External links
  

1931 births
Possibly living people
Swiss male rowers
Olympic rowers of Switzerland
Rowers at the 1960 Summer Olympics
Rowers from Zürich
European Rowing Championships medalists